The Lady Wants Mink is a 1953 American comedy film directed by William A. Seiter and written by Dane Lussier and Richard Alan Simmons. The film stars Dennis O'Keefe, Ruth Hussey, Eve Arden, William Demarest, Gene Lockhart and Hope Emerson. The film was released on March 30, 1953, by Republic Pictures.

Plot
Jim Connors buys his wife a new coat, but neighbor Harvey Jones tops him by buying his own wife Gladys a mink. Nora Connors doesn't mind a bit, but Jim, a debt collector for a department store, becomes self-conscious about his income.

An off-hand remark by Gladys gives an idea to Nora to buy a couple of actual minks and bring them home. Although the animals are caged, they create problems with neighbors and with the city, which wants assurances Nora is not starting a fur business. She decides the family should move to the country and do exactly that.

Cast     
Dennis O'Keefe as Jim Connors
Ruth Hussey as Nora Connors
Eve Arden as Gladys Jones
William Demarest as Harvey Jones
Gene Lockhart as Mr. Heggie
Hope Emerson as Mrs. Hoxie
Hillary Brooke as Evelyn Cantrell
Tommy Rettig as Ritchie Connors
Earl Robie as Sandy Connors
Mary Field as Janie
Isabel Randolph as Mrs. Frazier
Thomas Browne Henry as Mr. Swiss
Brad Johnson as Bud Dunn
Mara Corday as Model
Robert Shayne as Cecil
Jean Fenwick as Faye
Jean Vachon as Doris
Vici Raaf as Daisy 
Mary Alan Hokanson as Marian

References

External links
 

1953 films
1950s English-language films
American comedy films
1953 comedy films
Republic Pictures films
Films directed by William A. Seiter
Trucolor films
1950s American films